Apurva Purohit (born 3 October 1966) is an Indian Businesswoman and author with over three decades of experience in the corporate world where she formed significant partnerships with private equity firms and promoters to build and scale up a diverse set of businesses - from early stage fledgling businesses, to setting up new ventures and to supervising turnarounds in mature and declining organisations.

Apurva has recently launched Aazol Ventures Pvt Ltd, a consumer products company which aims to create a market for traditional food items made by self-help groups and micro entrepreneurs, by reconnecting Indian consumers with their roots and the local foods of their regions.

She is also an Independent director at Mindtree Ltd, L&T Technology services Ltd, Navin Fluorine International Ltd and Marico Ltd.

Apurva has been a leading voice in the Indian business landscape advocating gender diversity, what ails it, and what organisations and leaders can do to improve this critical imperative. She is also the author of the two national bestselling books “Lady, You’re not a Man” – the Adventures of a Woman at Work and "Lady, You’re the Boss"! Through her books, Apurva aims to empower women and encourage them to achieve their full potential.

Biography

Early life and education
Apurva has a bachelor's degree in Science (Physics) from Stella Maris College, Chennai and completed her master's degree in business administration from Indian Institute of Management Bangalore. She was a state-level field hockey player and represented Tamil Nadu in the sport.

Career 
She has worked across a variety of media businesses from radio to print to digital and was responsible for building and scaling up Radio City to become a leader in the FM radio space, and subsequently listing it on the stock exchanges in 2017, one of the most successful IPOs in those years. She was responsible for setting up Lodestar, which is today one of the largest media buying agencies in the country, and envisioning Times of India’s entry strategy into television, and has also worked on famed turnarounds like Zee TV and Mid-day, pivoting it from a traditional print business to a marquee and respected print and digital brand.

Under her people-oriented leadership and focus on building a great culture, one of her portfolio companies, Radio City was consecutively featured in the Great Place To Work survey for 7 years in India and amongst the Best Places to Work in Asia, and has become a case study on building high impact cultures which have a direct correlation on profitability.

Recognition
Over the years, Apurva has won multiple business awards and has been repeatedly named as one of the Most Powerful Women in Business as per the India Today Group and Fortune India.

 She was amongst LinkedIn’s Top Voices and YourStory's Top 10 digital Influencers of 2020. 
 She was recently awarded the Distinguished Alumni Award from IIM Bangalore in 2022.
 She has been ranked as one of the Top 30 Most Powerful Women in Business as per Business Today in 2016, 2018 and 2019. 
 She was featured in Fortune India's Most Powerful Women in Business list 2018, 2019 and 2020.

Bibliography 
 Lady, You're Not a Man!: The Adventures of a Woman at Work
 Lady, You're the Boss!: The Adventures of a Woman at Work – Part 2

Personal life
Apurva is married to Sanjay Purohit  and has a son Siddharth Purohit. She lives in Mumbai. She is an avid sports follower and represented Tamil Nadu in hockey in 1984–1987.

References 

1966 births
Living people
Indian business executives
Indian Institute of Management Bangalore alumni